School District 82 Coast Mountains is a school district in northwestern British Columbia between Prince Rupert and Prince George. This includes the major centres of Terrace, Kitimat and extends to the town of Stewart on the BC-Alaska border.

History
School District 82 was created in 1996 by the amalgamation of School District 80 (Kitimat) and School District 88 (Terrace)

Until 2000, the school district had also provided schooling to American students from neighbouring Hyder, Alaska.

Schools

See also
List of school districts in British Columbia

External links
Coast Mountains School District Website

Terrace, British Columbia
82